The white-bellied cuckooshrike (Coracina papuensis) is a species of bird in the family Campephagidae.  It is found in Australia, the Moluccas, New Guinea and the Solomon Islands.

Description 

This species exhibits a short black mask extending from the beak to the eyes (lores) but not beyond with a fine white rear eye-ring  . The head and upperparts including upper wings are pale blue-grey with tail feathers tending towards darker grey. Despite the name, the belly can be white to grey depending on region and subspecies. The subspecies Coracina papuensis robusta can present with a dark morph that has extensive black plumage on the neck and chest that can be barred at the edges. There is little variation between the sexes. Immature birds can have the underparts lightly barred and appear duller than adults with a less distinct black mask. This species can be mistaken for the black-faced cuckooshrike due to similar markings but is smaller with a more compact build.  An adult white-bellied cuckooshrike grows to between 22-29 cm and weighs 55-80 g.

The white-bellied cuckooshrike has a characteristic call that is described as a peevish kissik kissik or quiseek. It also produces a weak, squealing, slurred, repeating whee-eeyu or wee-year that has been likened to that of a parrot (Psittacidae). It is often spotted flying due to its distinct undulating pattern of flight where the species gains altitude by flapping its wings then holding its wings stiffly downward to glide.

Taxonomy
Johann Friedrich Gmelin first identified and named Coracina papuensis in 1788. In 1865 John Gould gave it the species name Graucalus hypoleucos not realising it had already been named by Gmelin. Since its identification and naming in 1788, several subspecies of Coracina papuensis have been identified and named.

·        Coracina papuensis oriomo (Mayr & Rand, 1936)

·        Coracina papuensis angustifrons (Sharpe, 1876)

·        Coracina papuensis louisiadensis (Hartert, 1898)

·        Coracina papuensis sclaterii (Salvadori, 1878)

·        Coracina papuensis perpallida (Rothschild & Hartert, 1916)

·        Coracina papuensis elegans (Ramsay, EP, 1881)

·        Coracina papuensis eyerdami (Mayr, 1931)

·        Coracina papuensis timorlaoensis (Meyer, AB, 1884)

·        Coracina papuensis hypoleuca (Gould, 1848)

·        Coracina papuensis apsleyi (Mathews, 1912)

·        Coracina papuensis artamoides (Schodde & Mason, 1999)

·        Coracina papuensis robusta (Latham, 1801)

Ecology

Breeding 
The white-bellied cuckooshrike breeds between August and March in Australia while in southern New Guinea (Port Moresby region) breeding occurs between March and June. Both adults construct the nest, usually on a horizontal fork from 7-10 m above the ground. The nest consists of a shallow cup made from a combination of grass, fine twigs, bark, leaves and vine tendrils bound together with spider webs and decorated with lichen. The clutch of eggs ranges from 1-3 with colourings differing between regions. In Papua New Guinea eggs appear pale blue-green with dark markings. In Australia eggs can exhibit a range of different colourings including pale olive-green to pale olive-brown, chestnut brown, and dull grey. The eggs are incubated and cared for by both adults with the incubation period lasting 21 or 22 days and the fledgling period lasting approximately 22 days.

Diet 
They predominantly feed on larger insects like dragonflies (Odonata), cockroaches (Blattodea), mantids (Mantodea), grasshoppers (Orthoptera), bugs (Hemiptera), beetles (Coleoptera), stick-insects (Phasmatidae), lepidopteran larvae, and ants and wasps (Hymenoptera). Spiders (Araneae), fruit and seeds also feature in their diet. They typically employ gleaning to forage for insects among tree foliage singly, in twos or small groups. This involves moving though trees from canopy to mid-level taking insects from tree foliage. They also occasionally employ sallying techniques or forage on the ground.

Distribution and habitat 
The white-bellied cuckooshrike range includes parts of Australia, Indonesia, Papua New Guinea and the Solomon Islands. In Australia it has been found throughout tropical northern Australia and eastern Australia including the northern parts of Western Australia, the Northern Territory, Queensland, New South Wales, Victoria and southeast South Australia. The white-bellied cuckooshrike is common throughout Papua New Guinea, the Solomon Islands and less common in Indonesia. In Indonesia the white-bellied cuckooshrike is commonly found in the northern Moluccas and occasionally found in Eastern Wallacea.

The white-bellied cuckooshrike thrives in many different habitats and vegetation types including , savanna, woodlands, Eucalyptus forests, riparian forest, rainforest, littoral forest, river redgum bushland, mangroves, open grasslands, coconut plantations, farmlands, and suburban gardens. It prefers lower-lying and forested habitats mainly below 800 m asl. They are predominantly sedentary or locally nomadic; however, the subspecies C. p. robusta can be considered migratory.

Conservation status 
The white-bellied cuckooshrike has an extremely large range appearing throughout Australia, Papua New Guinea, the Solomon Islands and the Moluccas. Its population does not approach “thresholds for vulnerable status under the range size criterion (Extent of Occurrence <20,000 km2 combined with a declining or fluctuating range size, habitat extent/quality, or population size and a small number of locations or severe fragmentation)” and as the population trend appears to be increasing, it “does not approach the thresholds for Vulnerable under the population trend criterion (>30% decline over ten years or three generations)”. Due to these reasons the white-bellied cuckooshrike is classified as Least Concern.

References

External links 
 ABID Images
  On the HBW Internet Bird Collection

white-bellied cuckooshrike
Birds of Australia
Birds of the Maluku Islands
Birds of New Guinea
Birds of the Solomon Islands
white-bellied cuckooshrike
white-bellied cuckooshrike
Taxonomy articles created by Polbot